The 2009 Wisconsin Wolfpack season was the first season for the Continental Indoor Football League (CIFL) franchise. Prior to the Wolfpack franchise's 2008 outdoor campaign, the Milwaukee Bonecrushers of the Continental Indoor Football League approached the Wolfpack coaches and staff and asked them to assist with the completion of their 2008 season following Gilbert Brown's decision to resign as head coach and the resulting resignation of most of the Bonecrushers' staff.  Kopac assumed the role of general manager for the Bonecrushers, and brought with him the core coaches of the Wolfpack outdoor team that would later become the core of the Wolfpack indoor team. Kopac led the team to its only win, a 51-46 victory of the Muskegon Thunder.

With infrastructure already in place from the outdoor team, and following the previous year's experience with the Bonecrushers, Wolfpack management announced in early 2009 it would field both indoor and outdoor teams that year.  To start the indoor team, Kopac coordinated with Lowe Entertainment, owners of the Rock River Raptors, also in the CIFL, to have Lowe run the indoor franchise while retaining Kopac as head coach.  The Wolfpack were Madison's second indoor football franchise and the first to call Madison home since the Madison Mad Dogs folded in 2001.

The Wolfpack played its inaugural season's home games at the Veterans Memorial Coliseum on the campus of the Alliant Energy Center and used AstroTurf previously belonging to the Pensacola Barracudas of AF2.  In its inaugural season, the team finished 7-5 and qualified for the CIFL Playoffs, The team started 5-1 but struggled late in the season after former All-American UW-Platteville quarterback Tom Stetzer was lost to injury.  The Wolfpack would fall to the eventual undefeated CIFL champion Chicago Slaughter in the 2009 CIFL Western Conference Championship Game, 63-19.

Schedule

Roster
The Wolfpack started pre-season training camp with 40 players.
The 25 man Roster was announced on March 1, 2009.

Roster

Standings

References

2009 Continental Indoor Football League season
Wisconsin Wolfpack
Wisconsin Wolfpack